Jean-Eudes Maurice (born 21 June 1986) is a professional footballer who plays for UR Namur in Belgium. He is a typical 'Number 9' striker known for his speed and accuracy. Born in France, he represents Haiti at international level and was a member of the squad at the 2013 CONCACAF Gold Cup.

Club career
Maurice began his career playing for his amateur local club US Alfortville. After spending seven years at the club, he moved up divisions joining UJA Alfortville. While playing here, he was noticed by Paris Saint-Germain and joined the club in 2007. He started out with the reserves appearing in 33 matches and scoring three goals. Maurice did appear on the bench with the first team, during the season, for a Coupe de France match against SC Bastia, but did not make an appearance. On 19 June 2008, he signed his first professional contract agreeing to a one-year deal. He was officially promoted to the senior team and was assigned the number 21 shirt.

For the 2008–09 season, Maurice made no league appearances, but did make his professional debut in the club's first leg 0–0 draw against Ukrainian club Dynamo Kyiv in the UEFA Cup, coming on as a substitute in the 75th minute. That was his only appearance of the season. On 11 May 2009, he signed a three-year contract extension with the Parisian club until the year 2012.

Chennaiyin FC
In October 2014, Maurice signed a short-term deal with Indian Super League club Chennaiyin FC. He scored his first goal for the club in a defeat against FC Goa.

Nea Salamis 
After Maurice's spell with Chennaiyin ended, he signed for Nea Salamis in Cypriot First Division. He penned a six-month deal with the Cypriot club. He made his debut against Anorthosis, to be substituted in the 62nd minute.

Taraz
In March 2017, Maurice signed a one-year contract with Kazakhstan Premier League side FC Taraz.

Aktobe
Maurice moved to fellow Kazakhstani side FC Aktobe in March 2018.

UR Namur
After a trial and a few friendly games, Maurice signed with UR Namur in the fourth Belgian Division at the end of January 2020. He signed a one-year contract. His first official appearance for the club came in March 2020.

Career statistics

Club

International

Scores and results list Haiti's goal tally first, score column indicates score after each Maurice goal.

Honours
Paris Saint-Germain
 Coupe de France: 2009–10

References

External links
 Profile on PSG Website 
 
 

1986 births
Living people
Association football forwards
French footballers
Haitian footballers
Haitian expatriate footballers
French expatriate footballers
Ligue 1 players
Ligue 2 players
Cypriot First Division players
Indian Super League players
V.League 1 players
Kazakhstan Premier League players
Championnat National 2 players
UJA Maccabi Paris Métropole players
Paris Saint-Germain F.C. players
RC Lens players
Le Mans FC players
Chennaiyin FC players
Nea Salamis Famagusta FC players
Ermis Aradippou FC players
Saigon FC players
FC Taraz players
FC Aktobe players
Union Royale Namur Fosses-La-Ville players
French sportspeople of Haitian descent
Haiti international footballers
2013 CONCACAF Gold Cup players
2015 CONCACAF Gold Cup players
Copa América Centenario players
Haitian expatriate sportspeople in India
Haitian expatriate sportspeople in Cyprus
Haitian expatriates in Vietnam
Haitian expatriate sportspeople in Kazakhstan
Haitian expatriate sportspeople in Belgium
French expatriate sportspeople in India
French expatriate sportspeople in Cyprus
French expatriate sportspeople in Vietnam
French expatriate sportspeople in Kazakhstan
French expatriate sportspeople in Belgium
Expatriate footballers in India
Expatriate footballers in Cyprus
Expatriate footballers in Vietnam
Expatriate footballers in Kazakhstan
Expatriate footballers in Belgium
People from Alfortville
Footballers from Val-de-Marne